Anthony G. Millar (24 September 1934 – 23 January 1993) was an Irish Fianna Fáil politician.

Millar was born in Ballydangan, County Roscommon, to Patrick Millar and Mary Beegan. A brother of his paternal grandmother was Michael Reddy, Irish Parliamentary Party MP for Birr from 1900 to 1918.

He was elected to Dáil Éireann as a Fianna Fáil Teachta Dála (TD) for the Galway South constituency at the 1958 by-election caused by the death of Patrick Beegan of Fianna Fáil, who was his uncle.

He was re-elected at the 1961 and 1965 general elections for the Galway East constituency. He did not contest the 1969 general election.

References

1934 births
1993 deaths
Fianna Fáil TDs
Irish farmers
Members of the 16th Dáil
Members of the 17th Dáil
Members of the 18th Dáil
Politicians from County Roscommon